University Heights Suburban Development Area (SDA) is an area in Saskatoon, Saskatchewan (Canada). It is a part of the east side community of Saskatoon. It lies (generally) south of the outskirts of the City and the Rural Municipality of Corman Park No. 344, east of the South Saskatchewan River, and Lawson SDA, north of the Lakewood SDA, and Nutana SDA.

Future Centre

This area at the beginning of the 21st century is one of the fastest growing neighbourhoods of Saskatoon. A multidimensional park is being planned, incorporating outdoor and indoor soccer fields, St. Joseph's High School, an artificial turf football field, the Alice Turner branch of the Saskatoon Public Library, a fire hall, and a recycling depot.

Neighbourhoods 

There are seven areas for expansion in the University Heights SDA
 University Heights Suburban Centre
 Willowgrove (2004)
 Evergreen (2011)
 Aspen Ridge (2015)
 Neighbourhoods 3-5 projected 2017-2025
The city commenced selling lots in Evergreen in 2011. Construction on the first phase of Aspen Ridge began in 2015.

Recreation facilities

 Saskatoon Forestry Farm Park and Zoo
 Saskatoon Field House
 Saskatoon Natural Grassland conservation area located east of the Forestry Farm Park and Zoo
 Petturson's Ravine located north of the Regional Psychiatric Centre, east of the South Saskatchewan River and west of the proposed new neighbourhood developments and across the road from the Saskatoon Natural Grassland conservation area.
 The Peggy McKercher Conservation Area, was dedicated on Tuesday, September 15, 2009, 2:00 pm This new  park is located north on Central Avenue past the Saskatoon Regional Psychiatric Centre and past Petturson's Ravine situated on the river bank.
 Outdoor skate park located east of the Recycling Facility

Education 

University Heights SDA is home to the following schools:

Post-secondary education
 University of Saskatchewan

Separate education

Secondary schools
 St. Joseph High School

Elementary schools
 St. Volodymyr School
 Father Robinson School
 Mother Teresa School
 Bishop Filevich Ukrainian Bilingual School
 Holy Family School
 St. Nicholas School

Public education

Secondary schools
 Centennial Collegiate

Elementary schools
 École Forest Grove School
 Dr. John G. Egnatoff School
 Silverspring School
 Sutherland School
 Willowgrove School
 Sylvia Fedoruk School

Library
 Saskatoon Public Library Alice Turner Branch Library

Transportation

The neighbourhoods are served by Central Avenue, McOrmond Drive, Fedoruk Drive, Attridge Drive which are main streets of the city. There will be a perimeter highway around the northern sector.
Saskatchewan Highway 5 enters this north eastern SDA of Saskatoon. SK Hwy 5 runs connects Humboldt, and Kamsack to the Manitoba border.

In May 2013 the City confirmed plans to build a north commuter bridge connecting with a northwestern extension of McOrmond Drive within the SDA. Completed in the late 2010s, the new bridge/McOrmond extension connects directly with Marquis Drive on the west side and provide an alternate city bypass route to Circle Drive, while also establishing the groundwork for future road connections to yet-to-be-developed neighbourhoods on the north side of the SDA.

City transit
The following routes serve the area; some of these only serve the University of Saskatchewan and are so listed.  There are bus terminals on the University campus and on 115th Street.
 1 Wildwood – Westview (U of S only)
 3 College Park – Riversdale
 5 Briarwood – Fairhaven (U of S only)
 6 Clarence – Broadway (U of S only)
 13 Lawson – Exhibition (U of S only)
 21 Forest Grove – City Centre
 43 Evergreen – City Centre
 44 Willowgrove – City Centre
 45 Arbor Creek – City Centre
 50 Lakeview – Pacific Heights (U of S only)
 60 Lakeridge – Confederation (U of S only)
 70 Silverspring – Lawson Heights
 80 Erindale/Arbor Creek – Silverwood Heights

References

External links 
 City of Saskatoon City of Saskatoon · Departments · Community Services · City Planning · ZAM Maps
 Populace Spring 2006

Neighbourhoods in Saskatoon